"Milk Em" is the only single by Ghostface Killah and his protégé Trife da God off the collaborative album Put It on the Line.

Song
Milk Em' was released as a single on independent record label Sound in Color. The single was released using five different producers each putting their own individual beat behind Ghost and Trife's rhymes.

Track listings

A Side
Milk Em' (Benny Cassette Version)
Milk Em' (Benny Cassette Version Instrumental)
Milk Em' (Strange Fruit Project Version)
Milk Em' (Strange Fruit Project Version Instrumental)

B Side
Milk Em' (Exile Version)
Milk Em' (Exile Version Instrumental)
Milk Em' (MHE Version)
Milk Em' (Ricci Rucker Version)

References

External links

2005 singles
Ghostface Killah songs
2005 songs
Song articles with missing songwriters